Galovany is a village and municipality in Liptovský Mikuláš District in the Žilina Region of northern Slovakia.
The village merged with the former Velika Paludza village in the 19th century.

History
In historical records the village was first mentioned in 1600.

Geography
The municipality lies at an altitude of 580 metres and covers an area of 12.924 km². It has a population of about 281 people.

Genealogical resources

The records for genealogical research are available at the state archive "Statny Archiv in Bytca, Slovakia"

 Roman Catholic church records (births/marriages/deaths): 1712-1933 (parish B)
 Lutheran church records (births/marriages/deaths): 1659-1948 (parish B)

See also
 List of municipalities and towns in Slovakia

External links
Statistics
Surnames of living people in Galovany

Villages and municipalities in Liptovský Mikuláš District